Eldred Henry (born 18 September 1994) is an athlete from the British Virgin Islands competing in the shot put and discus throw. He represented his country at the 2016 Summer Olympics finishing last in the qualifying round. Earlier, he competed at the 2014 Commonwealth Games and 2015 Pan American Games. He is the current national record holder in several events.

International competitions

Personal bests
Outdoor
Shot put – 21.47 (Kingsville 2019) NR and CR and NCAA DII Record
Weight throw – 18.32 (Coolidge 2015) NR
Discus throw – 61.90 (La Jolla 2014) NR
Hammer throw – 47.48 (Hutchinson 2015) NR
Indoor
Shot put – 20.61 (Glendale 2015) NR
Weight throw – 17.97 (Albuquerque 2015) NR

References

All-Athletics profile

1994 births
Living people
British Virgin Islands male athletes
Athletes (track and field) at the 2014 Commonwealth Games
Athletes (track and field) at the 2015 Pan American Games
Athletes (track and field) at the 2016 Summer Olympics
Athletes (track and field) at the 2018 Commonwealth Games
Competitors at the 2018 Central American and Caribbean Games
Athletes (track and field) at the 2019 Pan American Games
Olympic athletes of the British Virgin Islands
Commonwealth Games competitors for the British Virgin Islands
Pan American Games competitors for the British Virgin Islands
Central American and Caribbean Games bronze medalists for the British Virgin Islands
People from Road Town
Male shot putters
Male discus throwers
Central American and Caribbean Games medalists in athletics